Mladen Stegić (born 14 November 1980 in Belgrade, SR Serbia, Yugoslavia) is a Serbian rower.

He participated at the 2000 and 2004 Summer Olympics.

 2000 Summer Olympics – Men's coxless four – 8th place
 2004 Summer Olympics – Men's coxless pair – 5th place

References
Mladen Stegić biography and Olympic results at Sports-reference.com

1980 births
Living people
Serbian male rowers
Olympic rowers of Serbia and Montenegro
Rowers at the 2004 Summer Olympics
Rowers at the 2000 Summer Olympics